Aprapransa, originally called 'Akplijii (or Akplidzi)' is a Ghanaian GaDangme (or Ga) dish prepared by heat mixing (or blending) roasted corn flour with a sacred GaDangme soup called 'Palm Nut Soup'. As a point of emphasis, 'Palm Nut Soup', an important base ingredient in the preparation of 'Akplijii', is an ancient sacred soup of the GaDangme people, and is always prepared as a complement to another sacred corn flour meal called 'Kpokpoi(or Kpekpele)' during an 'Ancient Religious Hebraic Harvest Festival' called 'Homowo'. The GaDangme people brought these practices along with them to 'Ancient-Ghana' and taught all the tribes how to prepare this delicious 'Palm Nut Soup', just like the 'Akans' taught all the tribes how to prepare their delicious soup called 'Abunebunu(or Ebunuebunu)'. It is worth mentioning that outside Ghana, other tribes such as the Yorubas, Igbos, etc. in Nigeria process 'Palm Nut' in a similar yet different fashion into soup called 'Banga Soup'. Over the course of time, the knowledge of the preparation of 'Palm Nut Soup' in Ghana became common and it lost it sacred status. It may interest Ghanaians to know that the GaDangme people have from 'ancient time' to 'present day', used the palm tree in a number of sacred ways; namely, (1) To prepare a sacred soup called 'Palm Nut Soup', (an important base ingredient of Aprapransa, originally called Akplijii), (2) The burning of the dry figs as incense for spiritual cleansing and to ward-off evil spirits, (3) To build new houses every year made up of new palm tree branches ( i.e. new houses every 'Afi...OOO...Afi' ) which in our present day has been seriously reduced in practice because of embraced modernity in socio-cultural attitudes, (4) etc. The sacred uses of palm tree is not unique to the GaDangme(or Ga)-Tribe, for it is a common practice among several other tribes in the 'Congo-Niger Family'(or Bantu-Zone) of Africa. Akplijii(or Akplidzi) also known as Aprapransa is a food that is served on special occasions and it is feared to go extinct. 
Aprapransa as a complete meal is not a food that is commonly found on the streets of Ghana or is prepared every day in the house. It is usually served by the Akan tribe on special occasions such as marriage ceremonies, naming ceremonies, birthday celebrations, family cookouts, etc. Its name derived from the fact that it is a complete meal with its soup/stew integrated that one only needs to wipe their hand (prapra wo nsa) to eat.

Ingredients 
The main ingredients are roasted corn flour (Tom brown) and palmnut or palm oil. Other ingredients include beans, vegetables such as tomatoes, onion, pepper, ginger, or garlic. It features seafood such as smoked fish, dried fish, salted fish or crabs.

Roasted corn flour can either be purchased at Ghanaian markets or made from plain corn flour in a pan.

See also 

 Ghanaian Cuisine

References

External links 
 Video: How to prepare Aprapransa

African cuisine
Ghanaian cuisine
Maize dishes